Kampong Wasan is a village in the south-west of Brunei-Muara District, Brunei. The population was 482 in 2016. It is one of the villages within Mukim Pengkalan Batu. The postcode is BH2523.

References 

Wasan